Handrich is a surname of German origin. Notable people with the surname include:

Alvin A. Handrich (1892–1981), American farmer, businessman, and politician
Melvin O. Handrich (1919–1950), American World War II and Korean War veteran
Uwe Handrich (born 1959), East German luger
Dia Handrich also known as Dia Mirza, a German-Indian actress

References

Surnames of German origin